The Royal Hong Kong Regiment (The Volunteers) (RHKR(V))), formed in May 1854, was a local auxiliary militia force funded and administered by the colonial Government of Hong Kong. Its powers and duties were mandated by the Royal Hong Kong Regiment Ordnance.

During the imperial age, home defence units were raised in various British colonies with the intention of allowing regular army units tied up on garrison duty to be deployed elsewhere. These units were generally organised along British Army lines. The first locally raised militia in Hong Kong was the Hong Kong Volunteers, a forerunner of what was to become the Royal Hong Kong Regiment (The Volunteers).

Although the British government, as national government, was responsible for the defence of the territories and colonies, and held direct control of military units raised within them, the local forces were raised and funded by the local governments or the territories and as such the RHKR(V) was always a branch of the Hong Kong government. It was not a part of the reserve force of the British Army. The RHKR(V) did however form part of the order of battle of 48 Gurkha Infantry Brigade and were under command of the commander of the British forces in Hong Kong.

These locally raised defence units met British military standards in organisation and efficiency. Many of the officers and NCOs attended training in the UK. Although colonial/overseas British territories' auxiliary units could have no tasking under the British Ministry of Defence, and members could not be compelled to serve outside their territory, many served voluntarily on attachment to British Regular and Territorial Army units.

The regiment, which disbanded in 1995, should not be confused with the separate, shortlived Hong Kong Regiment (1892–1902), which was a regular infantry regiment of the British Army, recruited in India.

History

The beginning

The Hong Kong Volunteers was formed in 1854 when the Crimean War led to a reduction of the British military presence in Hong Kong. To help bolster the defences at a time when marauding pirates were still a hazard on the China coast a call for local volunteers was made. A total of 99 Europeans were recruited, mostly British but with some Portuguese, Scandinavians and Germans also answering the call. However almost as soon as it was founded, it was disbanded when the threat of war in Europe receded, and Regular units of the British Army were once again able to resume responsibility for the security of Hong Kong.

In 1862, the Hong Kong Volunteers was re-established, and in 1864 they were called out to help subdue a serious outbreak of rioting between British and Indian soldiers. In 1866 it was disbanded again. In 1878, the Hong Kong Volunteers was reborn as the "Hong Kong Artillery and Rifle Volunteer Corps". By 1917, it was renamed as the "Hong Kong Defence Corps" was actively engaged in guard and patrol duties during World War I when, owing to the recall of the British forces, they were the only military unit left in Hong Kong.

In 1933, the Hong Kong Defence Corps acquired their first armoured car, equipped with an armour-plated body and mountings for two machine-guns. Later, four others were bought by the colonial government. The bodywork was outfitted by the Hong Kong and Whampoa Dock Company. These armoured cars played an important role in the Battle of Hong Kong in December 1941.

World War II

The Hong Kong Defence Corps, renamed the "Hong Kong Volunteer Defence Corps" (HKVDC), met their severest test in the bitter fighting that took place in the crucial weeks before the fall of Hong Kong on Christmas Day 1941. On 8 December 1941, the HKVDC, deployed a total fighting strength of 2200 all ranks in 7 infantry companies, 5 artillery batteries, 5 machine gun companies equipped with Vickers machine gun and an armoured car platoon.

While only seeing light action in the New Territories at the beginning of the Japanese attack, the Volunteers were heavily engaged on Hong Kong Island, especially during the key battles of Wong Nai Chung Gap and Stanley. Casualties among 3 Coy at the former, and 1 Bty at the latter, were extremely heavy. 1 and 2 (Scottish) companies also suffered heavy losses, as did 5 Bty.

Out of the mobilised strength of 2200, 289 were listed either as missing or killed, and many others became prisoners of war. Some, however, made their way into China where the British Army Aid Group was formed to assist the Chinese Government in the struggle against the Japanese. A number of these men later joined the Hong Kong Volunteer Company in Burma, where they were attached to the Chindits under General Orde Wingate. The services of the defence corps were later recognised by the award of 19 decorations and 18 mentioned in despatch for gallantry and good service. As a recognition of The Hong Kong Volunteer Defence Corps defence of Hong Kong during 1941, the Corps was awarded the battle honour "Hong Kong".

The colours of the Hong Kong Volunteer Defence Corps was put under the care of Lt. Ralph James Shrigley who buried the colours during the battle near the Fortress HQ of the regiment to prevent their capture by Japanese forces. Lt. Shrigley was later captured on the 25 December 1941 and was transferred to "Camp S" as a prisoner of war before killing himself on the 28 June 1944 to prevent further mistreatment by the Kempetai looking for the colours. The burial place was later found in 1957 but the flags had already deteriorated leaving only the poles.

Post-WWII
In 1949, The Hong Kong Regiment were reorganised and became part of the Hong Kong Defence Force, which also included separate air and naval units. In 1951 the new combined defence force was granted the title 'Royal', and replacement colours were entrusted to the care of the regiment as successor to the defunct Defence Corps.

In the early 1960s, the role of the Royal Hong Kong Defence Force changed from that of an infantry battalion to a reconnaissance regiment equipped with six British Ferret armoured cars (each armed with Browning .30-inch machine-gun) were acquired. The regiment was reorganise to form a headquarters, headquarters squadron, three reconnaissance squadrons, an infantry company and a home guard company. During the 1967 leftist riots, the Royal Hong Kong Defence Force were called out during the six-month disturbances in Hong Kong. The RHKR assisted in establishing the Junior Leaders Corps on  22 December 1969.

By 1970, the naval unit was phased out and in 1970 the Royal Hong Kong Defence Force was itself disbanded – the two remaining member units, the Hong Kong Regiment and the Hong Kong Auxiliary Air Force, officially becoming separate entities. At the same time, both were granted the 'Royal' title by Queen Elizabeth II, and the words 'The Volunteers' were incorporated into the Hong Kong Regiment's title. With its new title and colours, the RHKR(V) was reorganised as a light reconnaissance unit operating under the command of the British Forces Overseas Hong Kong.

In the late 1970s the Volunteers were deployed to assist the civil powers over the problem of illegal immigration from China; as the problem grew from 1980 till 1992 the Volunteers were deployed to man the defences of the Chinese-Hong Kong border. In the late 1980s to early 1990s the Volunteers were deployed to support the colonial government in controlling the flood of Vietnamese illegal migrants, commonly known as the "Boat People". This included guarding temporary detention camps for Vietnamese migrants.

Organisation
The regiment included several units:

Regimental Headquarters
Headquarters Squadron
A,B,C,D Saber Squadron
Regimental Police
Home Guard Squadron
Training Squadron
Band
Junior Leader Corps - 'J Corps' was a youth organisation created by the RHKR(V) in 1971 and now renamed Hong Kong Adventure Corps.

The end
The Sino-British Joint Declaration on the question of Hong Kong as a British colony was finalised and the joint declaration was signed in Beijing on 19 December 1984. On 27 May 1985, instruments of ratification were exchanged and the agreement entered into force. It was registered at the United Nations by the British and Chinese governments on 12 June 1985.

In April 1992, the Security Branch of the Hong Kong Government formally announced that the regiment would disband in September 1995. The RHKR was officially disbanded on 3 September 1995.

Commanding Officers

Lt Col K B L Simson  April 1993-3rd September 1995

The Royal Hong Kong Regiment (The Volunteers) Association was created in 1995 as a charitable organization to support former members in Hong Kong with a Club House located at the Hong Kong Jockey Club Happy Valley Racecourse.

Successive changes of titles
 1854 – Hong Kong Volunteers
 1878 – Hong Kong Artillery and Rifle Volunteer Corps
 1917 – Hong Kong Defence Corps
 1920 – Hong Kong Volunteer Defence Corps
 1949 – Hong Kong Defence Force
 1951 – Royal Hong Kong Defence Force
 1961 – Hong Kong Regiment (The Volunteers)
 1970 – Royal Hong Kong Regiment (The Volunteers)

Equipment

Vehicles
List of vehicles used by regiment prior to disbanding:

1925-65
 one armoured car on Ford chassis with Vickers MG 1920s for Mounted Infantry Company
 one armoured car on Dennis chassis 1925 - modified by Hong Kong & Whampoa Dock for Mounted Infantry Company
 two armoured cars on Thornycroft chassis 1930-1933 - built by Hong Kong & Whampoa Dock
 motorcycles with Vickers machine guns
 four armoured cars on Bedford chassis 1940-1941 - built by Kowloon-Canton Railway Corporation

1965-95
 six Ferret scout cars 1963
 two Landrovers
 Land Rover Defender - from British Army units station in Hong Kong during 1970s to 1990s

Weapons
List of small arms used by the RHKR prior to disbanding:

 Lee–Enfield No.4 MkI rifle
 L1A1 Self-Loading Rifle
 Colt M16A2 rifle
 Colt "Commando" M177 Assault Carbine
 SA80 L85
 Sterling submachine gun (SMG) 9mm L2A 
 FN MAG General-purpose machine gun (GPMG)
 Bren LMG
 M1919 Browning machine gun
 Remington Model 870 Shotgun
 Browning Hi-Power

Badge

The regiment's badge at disbandment consisted of:

 St. Edward's Crown
 Two Chinese dragons as supporters, but without a crest
 Motto: Nulli Secundus in Oriente

Earlier badges had a Tudor Crown and the Volunteer Corps had no Oriental features:

 Tudor Crown
 Ribbon with the regimental name
 Coat of Arms of the United Kingdom within the ribbon
 Motto: Nulli Secundus in Oriente
 Laurel wreath

Colours and Guidons

See also
British Army Aid Group
Hong Kong Adventure Corps
Hong Kong Air Cadet Corps
Hong Kong Sea Cadet Corps
Hong Kong Chinese Regiment
Hong Kong Volunteer Company
Royal Hong Kong Auxiliary Air Force
Hong Kong Military Service Corps

References

External links

RHKR The Volunteers Association
RHKR Forum
RHKR Volunteers Association (Ontario) Canada
Hong Kong Volunteer and ex-PoW Association of NSW (RHKR Australia Branch)

1995 disestablishments in Hong Kong
Hong Kong
British colonial regiments
History of Hong Kong
Hong Kong in World War II
Military of Hong Kong under British rule
Military units and formations of the British Empire in World War II
Organisations based in Hong Kong with royal patronage
Reserve forces
Volunteer military units and formations
1854 establishments in the British Empire
Military units and formations established in 1854
Military units and formations disestablished in 1995